Alan Hamlyn is an English retired-American soccer defender. He began his career in England, before playing eight seasons in the North American Soccer League. He also earned four caps with the U.S. national team between 1972 and 1975.

National team
After gaining his U.S. citizenship, Hamlyn earned four caps with the U.S. national team between 1972 and 1975. In 1972, he played in three World Cup qualifiers. The first was a 20 August 1972 loss to Canada. That was followed in the next two weeks with a 2–2 tie with Canada and a loss to Mexico. Hamlyn did not play with the national team again until a 7–0 loss to Poland on 26 March 1975. A month later, he played in a 10–0 loss to Italy, but this was not an official national team game.

Early life
Hamlyn was drafted into the United States Army and served in Vietnam during the Vietnam War, where he received the Bronze Star Medal with "V" Purple Heart Air medal.
Prior to coming to USA he was a highly ranked sprinter in England getting a 3rd place medal in Great Britain Track and Field championship 4x110 relay.

References

External links
NASL stats

1947 births
Living people
American soccer players
Atlanta Chiefs players
Cleveland Force (original MISL) players
English footballers
English emigrants to the United States
Association football fullbacks
Fort Lauderdale Strikers (1977–1983) players
Major Indoor Soccer League (1978–1992) players
Miami Toros players
North American Soccer League (1968–1984) players
North American Soccer League (1968–1984) indoor players
United States men's international soccer players
Footballers from Greater London
United States Army personnel of the Vietnam War
Cobham F.C. players
English expatriate sportspeople in the United States
Expatriate soccer players in the United States
English expatriate footballers
United States Army soldiers